19 Naughty III is the third album from Naughty by Nature, released on February 23, 1993, through Tommy Boy Records. Recording sessions took place at Unique Recording Studios, Soundtrack Studios and Electric Lady Studios in New York City from February 1992 to January 1993. Three singles were released from the album, the group's second top 10 hit, "Hip Hop Hooray," as well as the minor hits "It's On" and "Written on Ya Kitten." Production was handled entirely by group member Kay Gee himself, with additional production from S.I.D. Reynolds. It includes guest appearances from Heavy D, Queen Latifah, Freddie Foxxx and Rottin Razkals.

Reception

The album did well commercially and critically, with 4-star ratings from AllMusic and Rolling Stone and platinum certification from the RIAA.  AllMusic stated in its review that the album ranked "as Naughty by Nature's second straight triumph."

Track listing
 "19 Naughty III" – 4:42
 "Hip Hop Hooray" – 4:26
 "Ready for Dem" (feat. Heavy D) – 4:06
 "Take It to Ya Face" – 3:18
 "Daddy Was a Street Corner" – 4:21
 "The Hood Comes First" – 3:36
 "The Only Ones" – 3:18
 "It's On" – 5:03
 "Cruddy Clique" – 2:43
 "Knock Em Out da Box (feat. Rottin Razkals)" – 2:09
 "Hot Potato" (feat. Freddie Foxxx) – 5:00
 "Sleepin' on Jersey (feat. Queen Latifah)" – 2:51
 "Written on Ya Kitten" – 4:21
 "Sleepwalkin' II / Shout Outs" – 7:43

Charts

Weekly charts

Year-end charts

Singles

Certifications

See also
 List of Billboard number-one R&B albums of 1993

References

1993 albums
Naughty by Nature albums
Tommy Boy Records albums
Albums recorded at Electric Lady Studios